Robert MacFarlane (29 April 1908 — 13 February 1986) was a Scottish first-class cricketer and administrator.

MacFarlane was born in April 1908 at Uddingston. He was educated at Uddingston Grammar School, before matriculating to the University of Glasgow. A club cricketer for Uddingston, he made a single appearance in first-class cricket for Scotland against Ireland at Dublin in 1939. Batting twice in the match, he was dismissed for 48 runs in the Scottish first innings by James MacDonald, while in their second innings he was dismissed for 20 runs by James Boucher, with Scotland winning the match by 162 runs. MacFarlane later served as the president of the Scottish Cricket Union in 1960. By profession, he was a schoolmaster. MacFarlane died at Uddingston in February 1986.

References

External links
 

1908 births
1986 deaths
People from Uddingston
People educated at Uddingston Grammar School
Alumni of the University of Glasgow
Scottish schoolteachers
Scottish cricketers
Scottish cricket administrators
Sportspeople from South Lanarkshire